is a Japanese manga artist best known for her work on Whistle!. Often she is mistaken for a man, namely because Daisuke is a name usually attributed to men.

Her self-portrait in Whistle! took the form of a crow.

History

Born in Gunma prefecture, she was recognized in the world of manga by being honored at the 43rd Osamu Tezuka awards in 1992 with third prize. In the same year, she became the author of a romance/action story called Itaru. In 1998, she became known in Japan for her soccer manga Whistle! and was said to be influenced after she went to France to attend the 1998 World Cup tournament.

With the success of Whistle!, she went to personally direct the creation of the animated series. She currently lives in Tokyo.

Works

Manga
 1992 - Itaru - short story
 1992 - Singing Flame - short story
 1994 - X-Connection - short story
 1997 - Break Free! - short story
 1998~2002 - Whistle! - series of 24 books
 2001 - X-Connection 2001 - short story
 2004 - NOIZ - short story
 2005~2006 - Go Ahead - series of 4 books
 2008 - Seirei Gakusha Kidan Reikyou Kaden (精霊学者綺談 黎鏡花伝), serialized in Kadokawa Shoten's Beans Ace - 2 vol.
 2009–present - Dokushi (ドクシ -読師-), serialized in Comic Birz - 3 vol.
 2012 - Sengoku Basara 3 - Kishin no Gotoku 
 2013 - Akashiya Ginga Shoutengai
 2016 - Whistle! W - sequel to Whistle! - 2 volumes ongoing

Anime
 2002 - Whistle! (As Original Creator)
 The short stories collection Break Free! includes a story starring characters from Whistle!  Two of the other stories are alternate versions of the one plot with the same characters.

References

External links
STELLA MIRA (Official Japanese Website of Daisuke Higuchi)

Manga artists from Gunma Prefecture
1966 births
Living people